Clarke Wilm (born October 24, 1976) is a Canadian former professional ice hockey centre. He played in the National Hockey League (NHL) with the Calgary Flames, Nashville Predators, and Toronto Maple Leafs between 1998 and 2006.

Playing career
Wilm was drafted 150th overall by the Calgary Flames in the 1995 NHL Entry Draft. He established himself in the NHL in the 1997–98 season after two seasons spent in Calgary's AHL affiliate. 

Wilm was known as a hardworking and unyielding checking line centre who has also received recognition as a good penalty killer. He can play all three forward positions.

After missing out on an NHL contract for the 2006–07 season, Wilm joined his former St. John's Maple Leafs coach Doug Shedden to play for Jokerit in Finland.

Wilm's tenure with Jokerit lasted for two seasons, during which Wilm made himself useful as a checking and penalty killing forward.

Wilm was contracted to Germany by the Hamburg Freezers for the 2008–09 season. After two seasons with Hamburg and one season with the Thomas Sabo Ice Tigers, Wilm retired from professional hockey after the 2010–11 season.

Personal life
Wilm was an avid deer hunter as a teenager. His name is spelled Clarke after Hockey Hall of Famer Bobby Clarke.

Career statistics

Regular season and playoffs

External links
 

1976 births
Living people
Canadian expatriate ice hockey players in Finland
Canadian expatriate ice hockey players in Germany
Canadian ice hockey centres
Calgary Flames draft picks
Calgary Flames players
Hamburg Freezers players
Ice hockey people from Saskatchewan
Jokerit players
Nashville Predators players
Saint John Flames players
St. John's Maple Leafs players
Saskatoon Blades players
Toronto Maple Leafs players